Dry wash may refer to:
Waterless car wash, a technique used to wash a vehicle without the use of water
Dry cleaning, any cleaning process for clothing and textiles using an organic solvent rather than water
Arroyo (creek), wadi, or similar dry waterways